Isham Franklin Norris Jr. (October 15, 1851 – September 23, 1928), also known as Isaac Norris, was a businessman and politician came to prominence in Memphis, Tennessee before moving to Oklahoma Territory and then Seattle, Washington. He served one term in the Tennessee House of Representatives for the 42nd General Assembly in 1881 and 1882. He was African American. He had a wife and family.

See also
African-American officeholders during and following the Reconstruction era

References

Republican Party members of the Tennessee House of Representatives
African-American state legislators in Tennessee
1851 births
1928 deaths
Businesspeople from Tennessee
People from Logan County, Oklahoma
People from Memphis, Tennessee
Businesspeople from Seattle
Washington (state) Republicans
19th-century American politicians
20th-century American politicians
African-American politicians during the Reconstruction Era
20th-century African-American politicians